Eric van der Luer (born 16 August 1965 in Maastricht, Netherlands) is a former Dutch international footballer who played as a midfielder.

He began his career with hometown club MVV in 1982 and spent five seasons there before playing with Belgian side Assent FC for a season. He joined Roda JC in 1988 and would spend the next 14 seasons at the club, also winning two caps for his country. After joining Alemannia Aachen in 2002, van der Luer retired from professional football after the 2003–04 season. With Roda JC, van der Luer won the KNVB Beker (Dutch Cup) twice in (1996–97 and 1999–2000), scoring in both finals.

Coaching career
From 2004 to 2008, van der Luer worked as a youth coach for Roda JC. In 2008, he then became manager of Alemannia Aachen's reserve team. He was later also appointed sporting director of the club's youth sector alongside his reserve team manager job. He stopped as manager for the reserve team at the end of the 2009–10 season and continued as head of the youth sector and assistant manager for the first team. He left the club in September 2011 alongside manager Peter Hyballa.

In July 2012 van der Luer became new manager of KFC Uerdingen 05. He guided the club to promotion to the Regionalliga in his first season. He was sacked in March 2014.

In 2015 he return to his old club Roda JC as manager for the second team, Jong Roda JC, and a scout for the first team. When Robert Molenaar was sacked as manager of Roda's first team in March 2019, van der Luer was installed as caretaker manager for the rest of the season. Van der Luer left the club at the end of the season, where his contract expired.

Honours
Roda JC
KNVB Cup: 1996–97, 1999–2000

References

External links
 Career Stats 

1965 births
Living people
Dutch footballers
Dutch football managers
MVV Maastricht players
Roda JC Kerkrade players
Alemannia Aachen players
2. Bundesliga players
KFC Uerdingen 05 managers
Roda JC Kerkrade managers
Netherlands international footballers
Association football midfielders
SV Meerssen players
RKSV Groene Ster players
Footballers from Maastricht